Stockwood Park is a large urban park in Luton, Bedfordshire, in the Farley Hill estate.  With period formal gardens, leading crafts museums, Stockwood Park Rugby Club and extensive golfing facilities, it is about 100 hectares in area.

Golf Centre
Stockwood Park Golf Centre opened in 1973 but since early 2020 Luton Council have been developing plans to close the golf course and manage the area as part of the Stockwood Country Park. Throughout its life the centre has been very profitable to the council but, in no small part, due to the mismanagement of the site by Active Luton (a company set up by the council in 2005) the centre has seen a huge reduction in both usage and income over the years. Luton Council now see the golf centre as a non viable business and as such, its future is in serious doubt.

Museum

Stockwood Discovery Centre, in the 18th century stables of the former Stockwood House, has displays of rural crafts and trades. They are representative of life in Bedfordshire before the Industrial Revolution. The collection was amassed by T. W. Bagshawe.

History
The park was originally the estate and grounds to Stockwood House, which was demolished in 1964.

When Stockwood house was built in 1740 by John Crawley, the grounds were laid out in a fashion befitting one of Bedfordshire’s leading landowners. The enclosed walled gardens provided shelter for growing fruit and vegetables for the house. One of the walled gardens now displays a series of gardens illustrating the changing styles of gardening through the ages.

Soon after the outbreak of World War II, the house was converted to a hospital catering for children suffering with hip diseases. The patients were transferred by converted single deck buses from the Bartholomews Hospital at Swanley in Kent. It was considered to be too dangerous in that area because it was on the edge of the balloon barrage. However Luton saw enemy activity due to the nearby motor works. Initially there was not any X-ray facility there, but one was added later and housed in the stable block. Before that installation, patients were taken by private car to nearby Luton and Dunstable hospital. The house was then named Alexandra Hospital  for Children with Hip Disease.

The park is sometimes used by Irish Travellers as a halting site.

Gardens

The Medieval Garden (12th to 15th century) shows herbs and plants grown for medicinal, cookery and dyeing uses. The 16th-century garden is laid out in a knots, a typical feature of the Elizabethan garden. The knots were planted out with germander, hyssop and box with the open spaces filled with brick dust or crushed shells to contrast the greenery.

Clipped hedges and urns decorate the small formal Dutch garden, replicating those designed by William Kent for Alexander Pope’s garden at Twickenham and the Wilderness Garden at Great Linford Manor.

English 17th-century gardens were heavily influenced by Dutch, French and the Italian styles. The Italian Garden is centered on a well head that once stood in front of Stockwood House.

The Victorian era was a time when plant collectors travelled the world in search of rare and exotic species and styles. Rock gardens and formal flower bedding schemes were also popular, decorated with a bright and showy variety of half-hardy plants. The invention of the practical mowing machine in the 1830s made lawns easier to manage and by 1860 were an essential part of garden equipment.

The Improvement Garden is a classical garden with sculptures full of allusions to ancient Greece and Rome.

See also
Stockwood Discovery Centre
Stockwood Park Academy
Mossman Collection
Wardown Park

References

External links

Stockwood Discovery Centre
Luton Borough Council: Stockwood Park
Active Luton: Stockwood Park

Luton
Culture in Luton
Parks and open spaces in Bedfordshire
Tourist attractions in Bedfordshire
British country houses destroyed in the 20th century
Country houses in Bedfordshire